UBALD1 (ubiquitin-associated like domain containing 1) is a protein encoded by the UBALD1 gene, located on chromosome 16 in humans. UBALD1 has high ubiquitous tissue expression and localizes in the nucleus and cytoplasm. UBALD1 is conserved in animals, including invertebrates. An alias for UBALD1 is FAM100A.


Gene 
The human UBALD1 gene is located on the minus strand of chromosome 16 at cytogenetic location 16p13.3. The gene contains three exons and two introns, with a total gene length of 6,145 base pairs.

Transcripts 
There are three isoforms of UBALD1 in humans, all of which contain three exons. UBALD1 isoform 1 has a mRNA sequence of 1,374 nucleotides and encodes the longest protein. Isoform 2 differs with an exclusion of 75 nucleotides at the start of exon 3, and isoform 3 differs with an insertion of 185 nucleotides at the end of exon 1.

Protein

Isoforms 
UBALD1 isoform 1 encodes the longest protein that consists of 177 amino acids. The protein sequence from isoform 2 is 85.9% identical to isoform 1. Isoform 2 contains an exclusion of 25 amino acids in exon 3 and lacks the PHA03247 domain. Isoform 3 greatly differs from isoform 1 and 2, being 35.6% identical to isoform 1. Isoform 3 contains 122 amino acids and an inclusion at exon 1, causing a frameshift of codons and earlier occurrence of its stop codon. Isoform 3 also lacks the PHA03247 domain.

Properites and Domains 
The protein encoded by UBALD1 isoform 1 has a predicted isoelectric point of 6.13 and a molecular weight 19.0 kDa. UBALD1 composition is rich in alanine and proline, and contains multiple duplets/triplets of these residues. Proline residues and multiplets are highly conserved, specifically within the PHA03247 domain. The protein contains one domain, PHA03247, or large tegument protein UL36 domain. Tegument protein UL36 is the largest tegument protein found in herpes simplex virus 1, and contains deubiquitinating activity.

Structure 

The UBALD1 protein secondary structure consists of mostly coils and four short alpha helical regions (positions 5-22, 25–46, 76–83, and 170–173). Its tertiary structure is subsequently coiled and globular-like.

Regulation

Gene Level Expression 
UBALD1 is a highly expressed gene, 1.4x more expressed than the average gene. UBALD1 has ubiquitous expression, with its highest levels in the placenta, skeletal muscle, liver, and brain. Within the brain, UBALD1 expression is highest in the hippocampal formation and olfactory regions

Protein level regulation 
UBALD1 protein is predicted to localize in the nucleus and cytoplasm. A nuclear export signal is located moderately at positions 79-85 and strongly at positions 174–177. UBALD1 has many predicted phosphorylation and glycosylation sites, with known phosphorylation sites at S88, S90, S93, and S96.

Evolutionary history

Orthologs 
The ortholog space for UBALD1 is large, with its most distant orthologs diverging 694 million years ago in invertebrates. The orthologs include most vertebrates, such as mammals, birds, reptiles, amphibians, fishes, as well as some invertebrates, such as arthropods, cnidaria, mollusks, echinoderms, and nematodes. There are no orthologs in fungi, plants, or bacteria. Closely related orthologs, including mammals, birds, and reptiles, range 67-92% seqeunce similarity. Moderately related orthologs, including amphibians and fishes, range seqeunce 55-75% similarity. Distantly related orthologs, including invertebrates, range 29-50% sequence similarity.

Paralogs 
The human UBALD1 protein has one paralog, UBALD2, present in vertebrates but not invertebrates. They are similar, with a 63.1% seqeunce identity and 70.9% seqeunce similarity. UBALD2 protein has a length of 164 amino acids, predicted isoelectric point of 6.78 and molecular weight of 17.7 kDa.

The UL36 tegument protein domain of UBALD1 is partially conserved in the UBALD2 paralog. UBALD1 has monoallelic expression, where as UBALD2 has biallelic expression.

Conservation 
Exon 1 and the beginning of exon 3 (positions 64–79), are highly conserved among strict and distant orthologs. Specifically, the proline residues in exon 3 (P65, P69, P72, P73, P76) are strongly conserved.

Interacting proteins 
UBALD1 has physical association with proteins MED8, found in the nucleus, and RPL9, found in the cytoplasm. UBALD1 also associates with EPRS and EEF1E1, both of which are known to interact and be involved in the aminoacyl-tRNA synthetase multienzyme complex.

Clinical Significance 
UBALD1 has been associated with various cancer types, and was identified as a significantly elevated autoantibody in lymphoma patients. Hypomethylation of the UBALD1 promoter region was associated with cell-cell adhesion, B cell activation, and lymphocyte activation, is a potential biomarker for predicting primary resistance to platinum-based chemotherapeutics. UBALD1 hypomethylation is also associated with gender incongruence. UBALD1 has significant CpG hypomethylation in trans women assigned male at birth before receiving gender-affirming hormone therapy, compared to cis men assigned male at birth.

References 

Genes on human chromosome 16